Sanchai Ratiwatana and Sonchat Ratiwatana won the title, defeating Adam Feeney and Samuel Groth 6–4, 2–6, [10–8] in the final.

Seeds

Draw

Draw

References
 Main Draw

ATP China Challenger International - Doubles
2012 Doubles